Football Academy of Šiauliai is a Lithuanian football academy from the city of Šiauliai. Simply was known as "Šiauliai". Academy have ladies and man's teams, also child groups and youngsters in U type championships.

ŠSG-FA Šiauliai is a ladies football team, representing Football Academy of Šiauliai. Currently play in top division (A lyga (ladies)).

History
In 2007 was established Football Academy of Šiauliai, when merged Napolis Šiauliai and sport school Klevas.

Ladies team
Ladies team known as ŠSG-FA Šiauliai.

In 2015 team played in Pirma lyga (2nd tier of women's football). Winners was promoted to top division.

In 2016 was merged team with Sport Center of Akmenė.

From 2017 season play team named ŠSG-FA Šiauliai. (Sports gymnasium of Šiauliai and Football Academy of Šiauliai.)

In 2018 was in 4th position.

Men's team

Recent seasons

Key
Tms. = Number of teams
Pos. = Position in league

Squad
As of 5 May 2020

Stadium

Savivaldybė Stadium is a multi-use stadium in Šiauliai, Lithuania. It is currently used mostly for football matches and is the home stadium of FK Šiauliai. The stadium holds 4,000 people. The address of the stadium: S. Daukanto g. 23, Šiauliai.

Famous players
 Tatjana Veržbickaja (2017, 2018)

Managers
  Vestina Neverdauskaitė (since 2016)
  Tatjana Veržbickaja (since 2016)

References

External links
 Official site

Association football clubs established in 2007
2007 establishments in Lithuania
Sport in Šiauliai
Women's football clubs in Lithuania